Major-General Stanley Fielder Mott  (1873–1959) was a British Army officer.

Military career
Educated at Eton College, Mott was commissioned into the King's Royal Rifle Corps on 27 September 1893. He became commander of 158th Infantry Brigade at Gallipoli in August 1915 during the First World War and, after being evacuated from Gallipoli, went on to be General Officer Commanding the 53rd (Welsh) Infantry Division in Egypt in April 1917. He commanded his division at the Third Battle of Gaza in November 1917 and later saw action at the Battle of Romani in August 1916, the Battle of Buqqar Ridge in October 1917 and the Battle of Tell 'Asur in March 1918. He retired in July 1919.

References

1873 births
1959 deaths
British Army generals of World War I
Companions of the Order of the Bath
King's Royal Rifle Corps officers
People educated at Eton College
British Army major generals